James Spink (1890–1943) was an English professional footballer who played in the Football League for Newcastle United as a right half.

Personal life 
Spink served as a corporal in the Durham Light Infantry during the First World War.

Career statistics

References 

English footballers
English Football League players
Newcastle United F.C. players
Place of death missing
British Army personnel of World War I
1890 births
1943 deaths
People from Dipton, County Durham
Footballers from County Durham
Association football wing halves
Durham Light Infantry soldiers
Craghead United F.C. players
Hartlepool United F.C. players